Bauernfangen ("catching farmers") is an old, trick-taking card game for 4 – 5 players, that used to be very popular especially in the Upper Austrian Hausruckviertel. Today it is also played in Lower Austria. It should not be confused with a game of the same name played in Bavaria which resembles Grasoberln.

Cards 
Bauernfangen is played with a  French or double German pack with the suits of Hearts, Diamonds/Bells, Spades/Leaves and Clubs/Acorns. There are five playing cards which rank as follows in descending order: Ace, King, Ober, Unter or Bower (Bauer = "farmer", plural: Bauern), Ten. There is no trump suit.

Rules 
There are 4 deals in the first leg and 4 in the return leg. In the first leg, the aim is not to take any Bowers in the tricks; in the return leg, players must aim to capture as many 'farmers' as possible.

At the start of the game, lots are drawn to decide the dealer. He then deals the cards clockwise so that every player has the same number of hand cards. The player to the left of the dealer leads to the first trick. As far as possible, players must follow suit. But they do not have to win the trick. If a player is void in the led suit, she may discard any card. The player with the highest card of the led suit wins the trick and leads to the next one. The deal ends when all four farmers have been captured.

Scoring 
Only the farmers captured in the individual games are counted. 

In the first leg the stakes are paid into a common pot in the middle of the table; in the return leg the relevant sum is paid out from the pot. The farmers have different values as follows:
 Unter of Hearts (Jack of Hearts): 0.40 euros
 Unter of Bells (Jack of Diamonds): 0.30 euros
 Unter of Leaves (Jack of Spades): 0.20 euros
 Unter of Acorns (Jack of Clubs): 0.10 euros

Game end 
The winner is the player who has won the most money after 8 hands.
The game may be repeated as many times as desired.

References 

Compendium games
French deck card games
German deck card games
Austrian card games
Four-player card games
Five-player card games
Point-trick games